Superdance South Africa is a South African television series which is focused on Latin dance. The series began on 16 September 2009 during the 21:30 (GMT +2) timeslot on South African TV network e.tv. The show was produced by Red Pepper Productions. The auditions were held in Durban, Johannesburg and Cape Town, where couples competed for a place in the top 14 in Johannesburg. The prize for the winning couple was to dance at the World Dance Event in Cape Town and a cash prize of R20000.

References
 https://web.archive.org/web/20110719024244/http://www.etv.co.za/pressoffice/press_releases/?current&action=detail&release_id=912
 https://web.archive.org/web/20090801143022/http://www.etv.co.za/pages/superdance_south_africa

External links
 Superdance Official Website

E.tv original programming